Atriplex coronata is a species of saltbush known by the common name crownscale. It is endemic to California.

Distribution
The halophyte plant grows in areas of saline and alkaline soils in the Central Valley and nearby slopes of the Inner California Coast Ranges in Central California; and the South Coast region of Southern California.

Description
Atriplex coronata is an annual herb producing stiff erect or leaning straw-colored stems up to about 30 centimeters tall. The gray scaly leaves are one or two centimeters long.

The flowers are generally oval shaped. The seeds are just over a millimeter long.

Varieties
There are two or three varieties of this species. They include: 
Atriplex coronata var. notatior — San Jacinto Valley crownscale, limited to the San Jacinto River valley in western Riverside County. It is as an endangered species since being listed on the federal level in 1998.

References

External links
Jepson Manual Treatment - Atriplex coronata
USDA Plants Profile: Atriplex coronata
Flora of North America
Atriplex coronata - Photo gallery

coronata
Endemic flora of California
Halophytes
Natural history of the California chaparral and woodlands
Natural history of the California Coast Ranges
Natural history of the Central Valley (California)
Flora of Riverside County, California
Flora without expected TNC conservation status